Kliny may refer to the following places:
Kliny, Kutno County in Łódź Voivodeship (central Poland)
Kliny, Opoczno County in Łódź Voivodeship (central Poland)
Kliny, Lublin Voivodeship (east Poland)
Kliny, Kępno County in Greater Poland Voivodeship (west-central Poland)
Kliny, Poznań County in Greater Poland Voivodeship (west-central Poland)